James Laing may refer to:

James Laing (doctor) (c. 1749–1831), Scottish medical man and plantation owner in Dominica
James Laing (footballer) (1897–1917), Scottish footballer
 Jim Laing, Canadian sportscaster and radio station owner
James Laing (archer), participated in Archery at the 2010 Commonwealth Games – Men's recurve individual
James Laing (shipbuilder) (1823-1901), Tyne and Wear shipbuilder and High Sheriff of Durham 1879

See also 
James Lang (disambiguation)
Jamie Laing (born 1988), on the British TV series Made in Chelsea